Si Phraya may refer to:
Si Phraya Road, a road in Bangkok
Si Phraya Pier, named after the road
Si Phraya Subdistrict, which covers the area